Neocrepidodera cyanescens is a species of black coloured flea beetle from Chrysomelidae family that can be found in Austria, Czech Republic, France, Italy, Poland, Romania, Slovakia, Slovenia, Switzerland, and Ukraine.

References

Beetles described in 1825
Beetles of Europe
cyanescens